Troublegum is the second major label album by rock band Therapy? It was released on 7 February 1994 via A&M Records. The album features a more punk-oriented style compared to the likes of Stiff Little Fingers and the Undertones rather the band's previous noise rock-influenced works.

Background
The album was recorded in 1993 at Chipping Norton Recording Studios in Oxfordshire, as well as RAK Studios and Church Studios, both in London. It has a melodically dark, metal-like sound. The album contains a cover of "Isolation" by Joy Division, which also became a single. The Therapy? version also incorporates many musical elements from "Atrocity Exhibition". Troublegum is generally considered to be Therapy? at their musical and commercial peak and has since sold over one million copies worldwide. The album reached number 5 in the UK Albums Chart and was certified gold in the UK in September 1994. It was also nominated as album of the year by the Mercury Prize of 1994.

Releases
The album was released on 12" vinyl, CD and cassette. In the UK, the album was released on limited edition green 12" vinyl. There was also a green cassette, and the original CD copies had a green tray. A remastered CD version of the album was included in The Gemil Box, released in 2013. To celebrate the 20th anniversary of its original release, a three-disc deluxe edition version of Troublegum was released by Universal on 31 March 2014.

Reception

The album was rated the top album of 1994 in the 1,000th issue of Kerrang! in 2004.
The album was number 31 in Kerrang!s 100 best British rock albums of all time.
The album was shortlisted for the 1994 Mercury Music Prize.

Track listing

Notes
The European release does not contain the "You Are My Sunshine" cover after "Brainsaw."

Personnel
Therapy?
Andy Cairns – vocals, guitar
Fyfe Ewing – drums, backing vocals
Michael McKeegan – bass, backing vocals
with:
Page Hamilton – lead guitar on "Unbeliever"
Lesley Rankine – additional vocals on "Lunacy Booth"
Martin McCarrick – cello on "Unrequited"
Eileen Rose – additional vocals on "Femtex"
Technical
Chris Sheldon – producer, engineer
Darren Allison – engineer
Nigel Rolfe – photography
Stuart Smyth – photography
Valerie Phillips – photography
Jeremy Pearce – design
Simon Carrington – design

Singles

"Screamager" - 11 March 1993, on the Shortsharpshock EP with "Auto Surgery", "Totally Random Man" and a re-recorded version of "Accelerator" from Nurse. This single reached number 9 in the UK Singles Chart, number 2 in the Irish Singles Chart and number 16 on Billboard's Modern Rock Tracks chart.
"Turn" - 31 May 1993, on the Face the Strange EP with "Speedball", "Bloody Blue" and a re-recorded version of "Neck Freak" from Nurse. This single reached number 18 in the UK Singles Chart, and number 5 in the Irish Singles Chart.
"Nowhere" - 17 January 1994, with "Pantopon Rose", "Breaking the Law" (Judas Priest), and "C. C. Rider" (Elvis Presley). A second CD was released on 24 January 1994, with two remixes of the title track, provided by the Sabres of Paradise. The single reached number 18 in the UK Singles Chart, and number 6 in the Irish Singles Chart.
"Trigger Inside" - 28 February 1994, with "Nice 'n' Sleazy" (The Stranglers), "Reuters" (Wire), and "Tatty Seaside Town" (The Membranes). A remix 12" was released with two remixes of the title track, plus the two Sabres of Paradise remixes previously released on the single "Nowhere". This single reached number 22 in the UK Singles Chart, and number 16 in the Irish Singles Chart.
"Die Laughing" - 30 May 1994, with "Stop It You're Killing Me" (live), "Trigger Inside" (live) and "Evil Elvis" (The Lost Demo). A remix 12" was released with two remixes of the title track, provided by David Holmes. This single reached number 29 in the UK Singles Chart, and number 16 in the Irish Singles Chart.
"Isolation" (Joy Division) - 1994, with "Lunacy Booth" (string version) and "Isolation" (Consolidated mix). This single was a German only release.
"Femtex" - 1994, with "Pantopon Rose". This was a coloured 7" released only in the US and limited to 500 copies.
"Knives" - 1994, with "Knives" (kiddie version), "Pantopon Rose" and "Nowhere". This single was a US only promo release.

Promo videos
"Screamager": directed by Jon Klein
"Turn": directed by Julie Hermelin
"Nowhere": directed by Nico Beyer
"Trigger Inside": directed by ?
"Die Laughing": directed by Matt Mahurin
"Isolation": directed by Michelle Spillane (version 1)
"Isolation": directed by ? (version 2)

Charts

References

1994 albums
Therapy? albums
Albums produced by Chris Sheldon
A&M Records albums